Lightnin' Smith Returns is a 1931 American Western film directed by Jack Irwin and starring Buddy Roosevelt, Barbara Worth and Tom London.

Cast
 Buddy Roosevelt as John Smith 
 Barbara Worth as Helen Parker 
 Tom London as Lightning' Smith 
 Nick Dunray as Mexican Pete 
 Jack Richardson as Chancey Ruggles 
 Sam Tittley as Tom Parker 
 Fred Parker as Storekeeper 
 William Bertram as Sheriff 
 Gilbert Holmes as Bandit 
 Slim Whitaker as Hideout Henchman

Plot
John Smith writes Western fiction without ever having visited the West. Helen Parker, a reader of his work, seeks to alleviate that situation by inviting him to visit her ranch for a real Western experience. Parker arranges for a fake holdup, with her impersonating outlaw Lightnin' Smith. Her plan goes awry when the real outlaw appears, giving the writer an opportunity to save Parker and her father. A 1934 film, Mystery Ranch, bore "a striking resemblance" to this one.

References

Bibliography
 Michael R. Pitts. Poverty Row Studios, 1929–1940: An Illustrated History of 55 Independent Film Companies, with a Filmography for Each. McFarland & Company, 2005.

External links
 

1931 films
1931 Western (genre) films
American Western (genre) films
Films directed by Jack Irwin
1930s English-language films
1930s American films